(literally 'rotten/putrid cheese'), sometimes spelled , and also called ,  and  in Sardinian, is a traditional Sardinian sheep milk cheese that contains live insect larvae (maggots). 

A variation of this cheese exists also in Corsica (France), where it is called casgiu merzu, and is especially produced in some Southern Corsican villages like Sartene.

Derived from pecorino, casu martzu goes beyond typical fermentation to a stage of decomposition, brought about by the digestive action of the larvae of the cheese fly of the Piophilidae family. These larvae are deliberately introduced to the cheese, promoting an advanced level of fermentation and breaking down of the cheese's fats. The texture of the cheese becomes very soft, with some liquid (called , Sardinian for "teardrop") seeping out.

Fermentation
Casu martzu is created by leaving whole pecorino cheeses outside with part of the rind removed to allow the eggs of the cheese fly Piophila casei to be laid in the cheese. A female P. casei can lay more than 500 eggs at one time. The eggs hatch and the larvae begin to eat through the cheese. The acid from the maggots' digestive system breaks down the cheese's fats, making the texture of the cheese very soft; by the time it is ready for consumption, a typical casu martzu will contain thousands of these maggots.

Consumption
Casu martzu is considered by Sardinian aficionados to be unsafe to eat when the maggots in the cheese have died. Because of this, only cheese in which the maggots are still alive is usually eaten, although allowances are made for cheese that has been refrigerated, which results in the maggots being killed. When the cheese has fermented enough, it is often cut into thin strips and spread on moistened Sardinian flatbread (pane carasau), to be served with a strong red wine like cannonau. Casu martzu is believed to be an aphrodisiac by Sardinians. Because the larvae in the cheese can launch themselves for distances up to  when disturbed, diners hold their hands above the sandwich to prevent the maggots from leaping. Some who eat the cheese prefer not to ingest the maggots. Those who do not wish to eat them place the cheese in a sealed paper bag. The maggots, starved for oxygen, writhe and jump in the bag, creating a "pitter-patter" sound. When the sounds subside, the maggots are dead and the cheese can be eaten.

Health concerns
According to some food scientists, it is possible for the larvae to survive the stomach acid and remain in the intestine, leading to a condition called pseudomyiasis. There have been documented cases of pseudomyiasis with P. casei.

Because of European Union food hygiene-health regulations, the cheese has been outlawed, and offenders face heavy fines. However, some Sardinians organized themselves in order to make casu martzu available on the black market, where it may be sold for double the price of an ordinary block of pecorino cheese.

Attempts have been made to circumvent the Italian and EU ban by having casu martzu declared a traditional food. The traditional way of making the cheese is explained by an official paper of the Sardinian government.

Casu martzu is among several cheeses that are not legal in the United States.

A cooperation between sheep farmers and researchers at the University of Sassari developed a hygienic method of production in 2005, aiming to allow the legal selling of the cheese.

Because of its fermentation process, the Guinness World Record proclaimed Casu Martzu as the world's most dangerous cheese.

Tradition
In Sardinia, pastoralism has been a key part in crafting the cultural identity that Sardinians embody today. Throughout the years, pastoralism has proven to be a representation of Sardinian culture through the connection of people, land, and food. Due to the landscape of Sardinia, sheep farming became a major enterprise and symbol of Sardinian culture. Many areas within Sardinia still rely on pastoralism as an economic means of living, as well as a traditional concept that has shaped their identity in many ways, such as through food habits. Pasteurization is essential in the making of cheese, which is a desired delicacy in Sardinia. More specifically, Casu Marzu, which is a traditional delicacy that has a local protection, but overall has been banned by the Italian Government due to health concerns. This cheese has been a staple in Sardinian culture as it was made by sheep farmers with their sheeps' milk. Due to the banning of the cheese, the method in which you create Casu Marzu has been forgotten by many, but not all. It is quite hard to find, but not impossible if you know where to look. Sardinia's traditional shepherds and elders keep the taste of Casu Marzu alive in Italy. Though this cheese is hard to find, it is still eaten during special occasions such as weddings and anniversaries of customary Sardinians.

Other regional variations

 in Piedmont;
 in Molise;
Casu puntu in Salento (Apulia);
Casu du quagghiu in Calabria;
 in Liguria;
Frmag punt in Apulia;
 in Emilia-Romagna;
Marcetto or cace fraceche in Abruzzo;
Salterello in Friuli Venezia Giulia.

Several other regional varieties of cheese with fly larvae are produced in the rest of Europe. For example, goat-milk cheese is left to the open air until P. casei eggs are naturally laid in the cheese. Then it is aged in white wine, with grapes and honey, preventing the larvae from emerging, giving the cheese a strong flavour. In addition, other regions in Europe have traditional cheeses that rely on live arthropods for ageing and flavouring, such as the German  and French , both of which rely on cheese mites.

A similar kind of cheese, called Mish, is also produced in Egypt.

An early printed reference to Stilton cheese points to a similar production technique. Daniel Defoe in his 1724 work A tour thro' the whole island of Great Britain notes "We pass'd Stilton, a town famous for cheese, which is call'd our English Parmesan, and is brought to table with the mites or maggots round it, so thick, that they bring a spoon with them for you to eat the mites with, as you do the cheese."

According to Rabbi Dr. Chaim Simons of the Orthodox Union, kosher casu martzu can be produced provided that all ingredients are kosher and animal rennet is not used.

See also 
 The Cheese and the Worms
 Corsican cuisine
 Insects as food
 Sardinian cuisine
 List of delicacies
 List of French cheeses
 List of Italian cheeses
 List of sheep milk cheeses

References 

Foods and drinks produced with excrement
Sardinian cheeses
Insects as food
Sheep's-milk cheeses
Dishes involving the consumption of live animals
Potentially dangerous food